Miguel Ferreira Campos (born 19 August 1996 in Fermentelos - Águeda) is a Portuguese footballer who plays for R.D. Águeda.

References

External links

Stats and profile at LPFP 

1996 births
Living people
Portuguese footballers
S.C. Beira-Mar players
S.C. Olhanense players
Liga Portugal 2 players
Campeonato de Portugal (league) players
Association football central defenders
G.D. Gafanha players
People from Águeda
Sportspeople from Aveiro District
NK Rudeš players
First Football League (Croatia) players